Croatia competed at the 2001 Mediterranean Games in Tunis, Tunisia from 2 to 15 September 2001.

Medals by sport

Medalists

References 

Nations at the 2001 Mediterranean Games
2001
2001 in Croatian sport